Lìbera. Associazioni, nomi e numeri contro le mafie (in English literally "Free. Associations, names and numbers against mafias") is an Italian association that promotes outreach activities and various types of protest action against the Mafia phenomenon, Italian organized crime, and organized crime in general.

From a legal point of view Libera is a non governmental association for social promotion (in Italian: Associazione di promozione sociale), recognized by the Italian Interior ministry. Since its foundation Libera has been soliciting and coordinating social activities against organized crime while encouraging the creation and the development of local communities that could be a valid alternative in the areas where the Mafia is strong.

The association do also coordinate the group of associations and companies that joined Libera becoming member of Libera's partnership. In 2011, 1,500 associations, foundations or corporations were members of the group.

With Associazione Ricreativa e Culturale Italiana, Italian General Confederation of Labour, Rete degli Studenti Medi and Unione degli Universitari organizes the "Campi della Legalità" summer camps in different Italian regions where volunteers can work on lands that were properties of Mafia families, which now are controlled by the state and administrated by these associations. Volunteers can visit places linked with the fight against the Mafia and learn about history of the anti-Mafia movement with the help of people directly involved.

History

Libera was founded on March 25, 1995 by Luigi Ciotti with the intent of promoting legal activities against Mafia. The first action of Libera was the collection of one million signatures with purpose of a law proposal to permit the reusing of the goods confiscated from crime organizations and this was successfully made true on March 7, 1996.

Libera is also recognized with the Special Consultative Status by the United Nations Economic and Social Council.
In 2009 Libera was awarded by European Economic and Social Committee. In 2012 was included in the list of the hundred best NGO in the world by The Global Journal that is remarkable also because it is the only Italian association included.

Since 1996, with the main Italian Trade Unions (CGIL, CISL, UIL) and with Arci (the biggest Italian non-profit association) Libera organizes the "Carovana Antimafie" an international project which, during a long trip, includes events about the fight against the Mafia in different cities.

President

The founder Luigi Ciotti is the president of Libera along with Nando dalla Chiesa, a sociology professor at the University of Milan, elected president honoris causa of the anti-mafia organisation. Nando dalla Chiesa was chosen because he has been active against mafia ever since his father, Carlo Alberto Dalla Chiesa, an Italian general notable for campaigning against terrorism during the 1970s was assassinated by the Mafia in Palermo in 1982.

Activities
Libera's cooperatives produce various products using goods and lands confiscated from Mafia organizations or families all over Italy by applying Italian law 109/1996, which permits certain organizations to reuse goods confiscated  from the mafia.

The aim is to promote a legal economy in respect to workers' rights, the environment and the law, and by doing this to restore the value of activities that were abandoned due to fear of the mafia.

Libera Terra

Libera Terra is a sort of trademark used by the cooperatives that are part of the Libera project. This trademark distinguish products made by cooperatives that use directly goods or lands taken from mafia for the production of its products. From these experience was created the consortium Consorzio Libera Terra Mediterraneo which involve nine cooperatives and other members that promote aspects of land reuse; for example promoting an aware and responsible tourism market.

Estate Liberi!
A lot of young students participate in this project of voluntary working and training in the lands or buildings taken from mafia and managed by social cooperatives that are part of Libera Terra. This is one of the most popular projects of Libera because of the will of the youngest and the commitment to this activities that also increase the sense of social responsibility and sharing. Estate Liberi activities are spread all over Italy from Lombardy to Sicily.

References

Sicilian Mafia
Charities based in Italy
Antimafia
Recipients of the European Citizen's Prize